Athens College is a co-educational private independent school in Psychiko, Greece.

Athens College may also refer to:

Athens College, former name of Athens State University in Athens, Alabama, U.S.
Athens College of Agriculture, former name of Agricultural University of Athens, Greece

See also
Athens Technical College, Athens, Georgia, U.S.
Athens Female College (disambiguation)
Athens (disambiguation)